Tarenna quadrangularis is a species of plant in the family Rubiaceae. It is endemic to Tanzania.

References

Flora of Tanzania
quadrangularis
Vulnerable plants
Taxonomy articles created by Polbot
Taxa named by Diane Mary Bridson